Frumosu may refer to the following places in Romania:

 Frumosu, a commune in Suceava County 
 Frumosu, a village in the commune Farcașa, Neamț County
 Frumosu, a tributary of the river Motru in Gorj County
 Frumosu River (Moldovița)